Anthene bjoernstadi, the Bjørnstad's hairtail, is a butterfly in the family Lycaenidae. It is found in western Kenya. The habitat consists of forests.

References

Butterflies described in 1991
Anthene
Endemic insects of Kenya
Butterflies of Africa